Adam Radecki (born 18 March 1994, in Białystok) is a Polish footballer who plays for Tur Bielsk Podlaski as a defender.

Club career
He made his Ekstraklasa debut on 3 April 2011 in a 2–0 defeat to Wisła Kraków.

References

External links
 

1994 births
Living people
Sportspeople from Białystok
Association football defenders
Polish footballers
Jagiellonia Białystok players
Ekstraklasa players